Gary Kellgren (April 7, 1939 – July 20, 1977) was an American audio engineer and co-founder of The Record Plant recording studios, along with businessman Chris Stone.

Career

Engineering
Kellgren was a successful and well respected audio engineer (and occasional record producer) during the 1960s and 1970s.  He began working at Apostolic Studios, Scepter Studios, and Mayfair Studios with musicians including Jimi Hendrix, Frank Zappa, and Wes Farrell.  "Mayfair Studios were the best in New York, and Kellgren was the king of the advanced eight-track board."

Kellgren was an early user of "phasing", a studio technique which simulates the sound of a jet engine. He is also credited with pioneering other "psychedelic" sound effects, such as "flanging", a sound which is sometimes confused with automatic double tracking (ADT).

He worked with musicians including John Lennon, Ringo Starr, George Harrison, Mick Jagger, Ron Wood, Bill Wyman, Jimi Hendrix, B.B. King, Bobby Goldsboro, the Animals, Stevie Wonder, Carole King, Frank Zappa, Sly and the Family Stone, Velvet Underground, CSNY, Rod Stewart, Ravi Shankar, Keith Moon, Barbra Streisand, and Neil Diamond. He also worked with producers such as Wes Farrell, Tom Wilson, Chas Chandler, Jack Douglas, Robert Margouleff, Phil Spector, and Bill Szymczyk.

He conceived of, and was responsible for, all the "Live at the Record Plant" recording sessions as well as the Jim Keltner Fan Club Hour; was sought out by George Harrison to record the Concert For Bangladesh which was later ranked as being No. 9 of the 50 Greatest Moments at Madison Square Garden; he also did the remote concert recording starring James Brown for the Muhammad Ali/George Foreman fight, "Rumble in the Jungle", in Zaire in 1974. He contributed spoken dialog to the Mothers of Invention's 1968 album We're Only in It for the Money, which he engineered as well. "I was there when he recorded Barbra Streisand, Paul Anka", said his business partner, Chris Stone: He recorded Anka for years. Everything he touched in the studio was a hit. Gary is remarkable in the studio. He really is ... He has engineered and produced records for Ron Wood and Bill Wyman. Even if he had done nothing else in his life, Kellgren would be famous among musicians for a jam he produced in March 1975, a never-released song called "Too Many Cooks". Present for the session were John Lennon, Stevie Wonder, Billy Preston, Mick Jagger, Al Wilson, Harry Nilsson, Jim Keltner, Ringo Starr, and Danny Kootch. The song was aptly titled.

Design
Kellgren began his recording career at the Dick Charles demo recording studios in 1964 in the legendary Brill Building in Manhattan. Studios at that time had no décor to speak of. They "were sterile, utilitarian places. Engineers wore jackets and ties (or even lab coats!), and musicians performed under fluorescent lights and acoustical tile ceilings while seated on folding chairs. Amenities – if any – consisted of bad coffee and a few ashtrays. Record Plant broke that mold in a style that is now the stuff of legend."  And when Kellgren and his partner Chris Stone opened the Record Plant, it was Kellgren's concept to bring color, artistic design, hotel-like comforts and services to the world of recording studios along with state-of-the-art technology and acoustical design.

In an interview for Mix magazine, Stone stated:

"There are tales told by the campfire, where rock mythology is discussed, that say the atmosphere created in that first studio and the ones to follow was so close to a good home and a fine hotel that songs were written to immortalize that special state of mind ... It is safe to surmise that no other 'facility' has ever lent so much of a creative edge to the works of art at hand."

Record Plant
In 1967, Kellgren and Stone built the first of the three Record Plant Recording Studios in Manhattan. Kellgren was the creative and recording side, Stone the business side, and their third partner, Ancky Johnson, Revlon heiress, provided the financial backing.  Kellgren had already been working with many of the top artists of the day, like Hendrix, so when he opened the Record Plant, they followed.  Mitch Mitchell: "We went there [the Record Plant NY] because Gary Kellgren, who we'd worked with at Mayfair, had raised the money with a partner and managed to start the Record Plant."  The NY Record Plant was booked solid for three months in advance at the time of the opening.

The first album to come out of there was Electric Ladyland by Jimi Hendrix. Stone later said in an interview that Gary, having worked all night, would very often be out cold on the couch, with Jimi still in the studio glaring through the haze at the speakers.  They would sometimes go three and four days without stopping.  Out of those sessions came Electric Ladyland, the Record Plant's first record.  Other people have taken credit for the record, but about ninety percent of it was done in Studio A in New York with Gary and Jimi. One of the last to record there was John Lennon, who left the studio to go home the night he was murdered.

Almost two years after the launch of the New York Studio, Kellgren and Stone opened up the Los Angeles Record Plant.  The first big mix session was for the Woodstock soundtrack.  It was also where John Lennon and Paul McCartney played together for the last time during an all night jam session in 1974.

Record Plant Sausalito opened in 1972, where Fleetwood Mac's Rumours was recorded as was Bob Marley & the Wailers' Talkin' Blues which was done live in a closed session for an in-studio broadcast from San Francisco radio station KSAN.

Death
On July 20, 1977, Kellgren and his girlfriend/secretary Kristianne Gaines were found dead in the swimming pool at his residence in Hollywood. A business associate of Kellgren was in the house at the time; he called police and reported that Kellgren had recently been in surgery, and that he had been swimming in the deep end of the pool. Gaines, 34, a resident of Los Angeles, was last seen alive sitting on a raft in the pool; she could not swim. The incident was called "a double accidental drowning" by the police. Two days later, an investigator told reporters that there was no indication of "foul play". Guitarist Ronnie Wood wrote that Kellgren probably died from electric shock while trying to fix some underwater speakers in his pool, and that Gaines drowned trying to save him.

Kellgren was survived by his wife Marta, their two children Devon and Mark, his sister Aleda, and his mother Crystal.

Discography

Albums
 1967: Chelsea Girl (Nico) - Engineer
 1967: Down To Middle Earth (The Hobbits) - Engineer
 1967: The Eyes of the Beacon Street Union (Beacon Street Union) - Engineer
 1967: San Franciscan Nights (Eric Burdon & the Animals) - Engineer
 1967: Winds of Change (Eric Burdon & the Animals) - Remixing
 1967: The Velvet Underground & Nico (The Velvet Underground) - Engineer, Mixing
 1968: The Twain Shall Meet (Eric Burdon & the Animals) - Remixing
 1968: The Clown Died in Marvin Gardens (Beacon Street Union) - Engineer
 1968: New Grass (Albert Ayler) - Engineer
 1968: I Could Have Danced All Night (Central Nervous System) - Engineer
 1968: Fraternity of Man (Fraternity of Man) - Remixing
 1968: Harumi (Harumi) - Engineer, Remixing
 1968: Electric Ladyland (Jimi Hendrix) - Engineer
 1968: Cristo Redentor (Harvey Mandel) - Engineer
 1968: We're Only in It for the Money (The Mothers of Invention) - Engineer, Whisper
 1968: Lumpy Gravy (Frank Zappa) - Engineer
 1968: High Flyin' Bird (Ill Wind) - Remixing
 1968: Trout (Trout) - Engineer
 1968: White Light/White Heat (The Velvet Underground) - Engineer
 1968: The Soft Machine (album) (Soft Machine) - Engineer
 1969: Street Giveth... And the Street Taketh Away (Cat Mother & the All Night Newsboys) - Engineer
 1969: Sunrise (Eire Apparent) - Engineer
 1969: Mothermania (The Mothers of Invention) - Engineer
 1970: We Got To Live Together (Buddy Miles) - Engineer
 1970: A Message to the People (Buddy Miles) - Producer, Engineer
 1970: Evolution (Hedge & Donna) - Engineer
 1970: Indianola Mississippi Seeds (BB King) - Engineer
 1970: Country Funk (Country Funk) - Engineer
 1970: A Bad Donato (João Donato) - Mixing, Engineer
 1970: False Start (Love) - Engineer
 1970: Purpose (Purpose) - Engineer
 1971: Dave Mason & Cass Elliot (Dave Mason & Cass Elliot) - Engineer
 1971: Band of Angels (Alan Parker) - Engineer
 1971: Stoneground (Stoneground) - Engineer
 1971: We've Only Just Begun (Claudine Longet) - Engineer
 1972: Let's Spend the Night Together (Claudine Longet) - Engineer
 1972: Peter Anders (Family LP) (Peter Anders) - Engineer
 1973: Reevaluations: The Impulse Years (Albert Ayler) - Engineer
 1973: Best of B.B. King (MCA) (BB King) - Engineer
 1973: Kracker Brand (Kracker) - Engineer
 1973: Coast to Coast: Overture and Beginners (Rod Stewart/Faces) - Engineer
 1974: Live and in Color (Ballin' Jack) - Producer, Engineer
 1974: Second Helping (Lynyrd Skynyrd) - Engineer
 1974: I've Got My Own Album to Do (Ron Wood) - Producer
 1975: Early Bird Cafe (Serfs) - Engineer
 1975: Two Sides of the Moon (Keith Moon) - Engineer
 1975: Lazy Afternoon (Barbra Streisand) - Engineer
 1976: Nine On A Ten Scale (Sammy Hagar) - Engineer
 1976: Stone Alone (Bill Wyman) - Engineer
 1977: Where Did All the Money Go (Soundtrack) - Engineer

Later releases of recordings made before his death
 1985: VU (The Velvet Underground) - Engineer (Recorded in 1969 by Kellgren, but not released until 1985)
 1991: Crosby, Stills & Nash (Box Set) (Crosby, Stills & Nash) - Engineer
 1993: What Goes On (The Velvet Underground) - Engineer
 1995: Love Story 1966-1972 (Love) - Engineer
 1995: Peel Slowly and See (The Velvet Underground) - Engineer
 1995: In Celebration (Ravi Shankar) - Remastering
 1996: The Lost Episodes (Frank Zappa) - Engineer
 1997: South Saturn Delta (Jimi Hendrix) - Engineer
 1997: Best of Buddy Miles (Buddy Miles) - Assistant Producer
 2001: Voodoo Child: The Jimi Hendrix Collection (Jimi Hendrix) - Engineer
 2002: Voodoo Child: The Jimi Hendrix Collection (UK Bonus Track) (Jimi Hendrix) - Engineer
 2003: Street Giveth...And the Street Taketh Away (Bonus Tracks) (Cat Mother & the All Night Newsboys) - Engineer
 2003: Martin Scorsese Presents the Blues: Jimi Hendrix (Jimi Hendrix) - Engineer
 2004: The Twain Shall Meet (Bonus Tracks) (The Animals) - Remixing
 2004: Five Guys Walk into a Bar... (Faces) - Engineer, Mixing
 2004: The Experience Sessions (Noel Redding) - Engineer
 2005: Retrospective (The Animals) - Remixing
 2005: Gold (The Velvet Underground) - Engineer, Mixing
 2005: Chronicles (The Velvet Underground) - Engineer
 2005: Concert for Bangladesh (Bonus Track) (George Harrison) - Engineer
 2005: Concert for Bangladesh (DVD)(Deluxe Edition) (George Harrison) - Engineer
 2005: Concert for Bangladesh (DVD) (George Harrison) - Engineer
 2006: The Velvet Underground Story (The Velvet Underground) - Engineer
 2006: Two Sides of the Moon (Expanded) (Keith Moon) - Engineer
 2007: Blue Thumb Recordings (Love) - Engineer
 2008: Electric Ladyland (40th Anniversary Collector's Edition) (CD/DVD) (Jimi Hendrix) - Engineer

Concerts
 1971: Concert For Bangladesh - Engineer
 1973: Coast to Coast: Overture and Beginners - Engineer
 1974: Rumble in the Jungle - Engineer

Further reading
 The Mix – Independent Engineers Forum – September 1978
 Prendergast, Mark The Ambient Century: From Mahler to Moby – The Evolution of Sound in the Electronic Age Bloomsbury Publishing (2003)
 McDermott, John w/ Eddie Kramer Hendrix Warner Books (1992)
 Black, Johnny Jimi Hendrix: The Ultimate Experience Thunder's Mouth Press (1999)
 Walley, David No Commercial Potential: The Saga of Frank Zappa Da Capo Press (1972)
 James, Billy Necessity Is…: The Early Years of Frank Zappa and the Mothers of Invention SAF Publishing Ltd. (2000)
 Stone, Chris Audio Recording For Profit: The Sound of Money Focal Press (2000)
 Jackson, Blair Grateful Dead Gear: The Band's Instruments, Sound Systems, and Recording Sessions from 1965 to 1995 Backbeat Books (2006)

References

External links 

 Droney, Maureen mixonline.com/mag: – L.A. Grapevine – December 2001
 Jackson, Blair mixonline.com/mag: – The '70s – November 2004

American audio engineers
People from Shenandoah, Iowa
Accidental deaths in California
Deaths by drowning in California
1939 births
1977 deaths
20th-century American engineers